James Stuart Rollo (born 22 May 1976) is an English former footballer who was the assistant manager of Bath City until 2021.

Career
Born in Wisbech, Rollo began his career at Walsall as a trainee but made just one first-team appearance for the side in the Football League Trophy as a substitute before being released. He instead joined Cardiff City on non-contract terms, making his debut on 31 January 1997 in a 4–1 win over Fulham after returning from a short loan spell at Bath City. In his first season at Ninian Park, Rollo made seventeen appearances including playing in the play-off semi-final first leg defeat to Northampton Town.

The following season, he scored his first professional goal during his career with a header against Southend United in the League Cup on 12 August 1997. However, in doing so Rollo collided with the post and was taken to hospital after being knocked unconscious. He made just eight more appearances for the side before being allowed to leave at the end of the season following a loan spell in the Welsh Premier League with Ebbw Vale.

He moved to Forest Green Rovers, where he spent one season but struggled to hold down a place in the first team and returned to Bath City for a second spell on loan. After a two-year spell at Clevedon Town, during which the club suffered relegation, he spent one year with Merthyr Tydfil. Despite being offered the captaincy at the Welsh side, he decided to leave and returned to Bath City, this time on a permanent basis, in May 2002. He was awarded the club's player of the year award in the 2004–05 season and helped gain promotion to the Conference South in 2007 and to the Conference National in 2010.

Rollo stepped up in to a player-coach role at Bath for the 2012–13 season following a management reshuffle at the club. In December 2012, he left Bath after a decade of service and joined Chippenham Town. His time with Chippenham did not work out however and in March 2013 it was announced that Rollo had returned to Bath.

Honours
Bath City

Southern League Premier Division Winner: 1
 2006–07
Conference South Play-off Winner: 1
 2009–10

References

External links

Welsh Premier profile

1976 births
Living people
Footballers from Birmingham, West Midlands
English footballers
Walsall F.C. players
Cardiff City F.C. players
Bath City F.C. players
Forest Green Rovers F.C. players
Clevedon Town F.C. players
Merthyr Tydfil F.C. players
Chippenham Town F.C. players
English Football League players
Cymru Premier players
National League (English football) players
Association football defenders